Loo railway station is a railway station of the North Caucasus Railway, subsidiary of Russian Railways, located in Loo Microdistrict, Lazarevsky City District of Sochi, Krasnodar Krai, Russia. The station was opened in 1918.

References

Railway stations in Sochi
Railway stations in Russia opened in 1918